These were the team rosters of the nations participating in the men's ice hockey tournament of the 2010 Winter Olympics. Each team was permitted a roster of 20 skaters and 3 goaltenders.

Group A

Canada

The following is the Canadian roster in the men's ice hockey tournament of the 2010 Winter Olympics.

Defencemen Jay Bouwmeester and Stéphane Robidas, forwards Jeff Carter, Steven Stamkos and Martin St. Louis, and goaltender Chris Mason were selected as reserves in case of injury during the tournament.

Norway

The following is the Norwegian roster in the men's ice hockey tournament of the 2010 Winter Olympics.

Forward Morten Ask was initially selected, but was injured and replaced by Jonas Solberg Andersen.

Switzerland

The following is the Swiss roster in the men's ice hockey tournament of the 2010 Winter Olympics.

Goaltender Martin Gerber, defencemen Goran Bezina and Roman Josi, and forward Kevin Romy were initially selected, but could not play due to injury. They were replaced by Ronnie Rüeger, Philippe Furrer, Patrick von Gunten and Romano Lemm, respectively.

United States

The following is the American roster in the men's ice hockey tournament of the 2010 Winter Olympics.

Defensemen Paul Martin and Mike Komisarek were initially selected, but due to injuries were replaced by Ryan Whitney and Tim Gleason.

Group B

Czech Republic

The following is the Czech roster in the men's ice hockey tournament of the 2010 Winter Olympics.

Latvia

The following is the Latvian roster in the men's ice hockey tournament of the 2010 Winter Olympics.

Russia

The following is the Russian roster in the men's ice hockey tournament of the 2010 Winter Olympics.

Defencemen Sergei Zubov, Oleg Tverdovsky and Vitali Proshkin, forwards Alexei Kovalev, Alexander Frolov, Nikolai Kulemin and Alexei Tereschenko, and goaltenders Vasiliy Koshechkin and Alexander Eremenko were selected as reserves in case of injury during the tournament.

Slovakia

The following is the Slovak roster in the men's ice hockey tournament of the 2010 Winter Olympics.

Defenceman Richard Lintner was initially selected, but was replaced by Ivan Baranka.

Group C

Belarus

The following is the Belarusian roster in the men's ice hockey tournament of the 2010 Winter Olympics.

Defencemen Andrei Antonov, Andrei Bashko, Vadim Sushko and Aleksandr Syrei, along with forwards Mikhail Grabovski and Andrei Kostitsyn, were initially selected but could not play due to injuries. The players chosen to replace them were defencemen Andrei Karev, Sergei Kolosov, Alexander Makritski and Alexander Ryadinsky, and forwards Dmitri Meleshko and Konstantin Zakharov.

Finland

The following is the Finnish roster in the men's ice hockey tournament of the 2010 Winter Olympics.

Germany

The following is the German roster in the men's ice hockey tournament of the 2010 Winter Olympics.

Defenceman Jason Holland was replaced by Sven Butenschön, and forwards Alexander Barta and Philip Gogulla were replaced by Kai Hospelt and Jochen Hecht, respectively.

Sweden

The following is the Swedish roster in the men's ice hockey tournament of the 2010 Winter Olympics.

Forward Tomas Holmström was selected, but due to a knee injury he was replaced by Johan Franzén.

See also
 Ice hockey at the 2010 Winter Olympics – Women's team rosters

References

Men's team rosters

2010